This page provides a list of scientific, nationwide public opinion polls that were conducted from the 2015 Canadian federal election leading up to the 2019 Canadian federal election, which was held on October 21. For riding-specific polls see 2019 constituency polls.

National polls

Campaign period

Pre-campaign period

Notes
 Polls that share the same last date of polling are ordered from earliest (below) to latest (above) first date of polling. Polls that have identical field dates are placed in the order in which they were released/published (earliest below, latest above).
 In cases when linked poll details distinguish between the margin of error associated with the total sample of respondents (including undecided and non-voters) and that of the subsample of decided/leaning voters, the former is included in the table. Also not included is the margin of error created by rounding to the nearest whole number or any margin of error from methodological sources. Most online polls—because of their opt-in method of recruiting panellists which results in a non-random sample—cannot have a margin of error. In such cases, shown is what the margin of error would be for a survey using a random probability-based sample of equivalent size.
 Refers to the total, "raw" sample size, including undecided and non-voters, and before demographic weighting is applied. Fractions in parentheses apply to rolling polls (see below) and indicate the proportion of the sample that is independent from the previous poll in the series.
 "Telephone" refers to traditional telephone polls conducted by live interviewers; "IVR" refers to automated Interactive Voice Response polls conducted by telephone; "online" refers to polls conducted exclusively over the internet; "telephone/online" refers to polls which combine results from both telephone and online surveys, or for which respondents are initially recruited by telephone and then asked to complete an online survey. "Rolling" polls contain overlapping data from one poll to the next.
 The People's Party of Canada was officially created on September 14, 2018 and voting intentions for the party were therefore not polled prior to this date.

Regional polls
A number of polling firms survey federal voting intentions on a regional or provincial level:

Atlantic Canada

Newfoundland and Labrador

Prince Edward Island

Nova Scotia

New Brunswick

Central Canada

Quebec

Ontario

Toronto

Western Canada

Manitoba

Saskatchewan

Alberta

British Columbia

Leadership polls
Aside from conducting the usual opinion surveys on general party preferences, polling firms also survey public opinion on who would make the best Prime Minister:

February 2019–October 2019

September 2018–February 2019

August–September 2018

October 2017–July 2018

October 2017

June–September 2017

June 2017

April–May 2017

March–April 2017

December 2015–March 2017

November 2015

See also
 Opinion polling for the 2021 Canadian federal election
 Opinion polling for the 2019 Canadian federal election, by constituency
 Opinion polling for the 2015 Canadian federal election
 Opinion polling for the 2011 Canadian federal election
 Opinion polling for the 2008 Canadian federal election
 Opinion polling for the 2006 Canadian federal election

References 

2019
2019 Canadian federal election